Linda Royster Beito is professor of political science and criminal justice at Stillman College in Tuscaloosa, Alabama.

Biography
Beito was born in Tuscaloosa, Alabama. She earned her Ph.D. in political science and her master of science in criminal justice from the University of Alabama.

Since 1999, she has taught at Stillman College, where she has received several awards for excellence in teaching. She was also inducted into the Zeta Phi Beta Hall of Fame at Stillman College.

She married David T. Beito on June 11, 1997 and they live in Northport, Alabama. She has three children, April, Keith and Quale.

Her second book (co-authored by David T. Beito of the University of Alabama), T.R.M. Howard: Doctor, Entrepreneur, Civil Rights Pioneer, was published in 2018. It is a biography of civil rights leader T.R.M. Howard.

Bibliography

Books

Selected articles and chapters in collections
 Let Down Your Bucket Where You Are':The Afro-American Hospital and Black Health Care in Mississippi, 1924-1966, Social Science History 30 (Winter 2006), 551-69.
 [www.saf.org/journal/17/Blacks.pdf Blacks, Gun Cultures and Gun Control: T.R.M. Howard, Armed Self-Defense, and the Struggle for Civil Rights in Mississippi,] The Journal of Firearms and Public Policy (September 2005).
Isabel Paterson, Rose Wilder Lane, and Zora Neale Hurston on War, Race, the State, and Liberty,, Independent Review 12 (Spring 2008).
T.R.M. Howard: Pragmatism over Strict Integrationist Ideology in the Mississippi Delta, 1942-1954, Glenn Feldman, ed., Before Brown: Civil Rights and White Backlash in the Modern South, University of Alabama Press (Tuscaloosa), 2004.
T.R.M. Howard: A Mississippi Doctor in Chicago Civil Rights, A.M.E. Church Review (July–September 2001), 51–59.
"Rival Road Builders: Private Toll Roads in Nevada, 1852-1880,* Nevada Historical Society Quarterly 41 (Summer 1998), 71–91.

References

Living people
People from Tuscaloosa, Alabama
American women political scientists
American political scientists
University of Alabama alumni
Stillman College faculty
Year of birth missing (living people)
American women academics
21st-century American women